Mirror to the Sky is the upcoming twenty-third studio album by English progressive rock band Yes, scheduled for release on 19 May 2023 by InsideOut Music and Sony Music. It will be their first studio album with American drummer Jay Schellen as a full-time member following the death of long-time Yes drummer Alan White in 2022, and to whom the album is dedicated.

Yes started work on the album shortly before the release of The Quest, their previous album, in October 2021. Like its predecessor, guitarist Steve Howe resumed his role as producer on Mirror to the Sky and the FAMES Orchestra in North Macedonia provide orchestral arrangements by Paul K. Joyce on some songs.

The album will be available on CD, LP, Blu-ray, and digital platforms, with some editions containing additional artwork by long-time Yes cover artist Roger Dean.

Background and recording
In October 2021, the Yes line-up of guitarist Steve Howe, drummer Alan White, keyboardist Geoff Downes, lead vocalist Jon Davison, and bassist Billy Sherwood, with Jay Schellen guesting on percussion, released The Quest. In the same month Downes revealed that the group had already discussed ideas for a follow-up album, to which Sherwood confirmed in May 2022 that work on it was underway. Later in May 2022, Yes announced that White would sit out of the upcoming 2022 world tour to commemorate the fiftieth anniversary of Close to the Edge (1972), due to illness. White died three days later and Schellen, who had been handling most of the band's live work since 2016, took over on the drums. In February 2023, Yes announced that Schellen had become a full-time member.

When work on the album began the band still had a lot of potential musical ideas to develop, partly due to the amount of time spent away from recording during the COVID-19 pandemic. Howe said the group were in a strong "creative zone" at the time, and approached Mirror to the Sky in a similar way to The Quest, but wanted the new album not to be a mere repeat of the last. Yes recorded the album in 2022. Like its predecessor, Howe resumed his role as producer and the FAMES Orchestra in North Macedonia provide orchestral arrangements by Paul K. Joyce on some songs. The band also continued to work with engineer and mixer Curtis Schwartz. They started with two ideas for songs that they wanted to turn into longer pieces, which would become the 13-minute "Mirror to the Sky" and the 9-minute "Luminosity".

Artwork
The artwork was produced by the band's longtime cover artist Roger Dean. His design was inspired by a story that video game designer Henk Rogers had told him, which involved Rogers paddling to the middle of a lake at night during a camping trip. When the ripples of the water had settled, Dean said that "the lake became a perfect mirror to a very brilliant night sky", an experience that Rogers said was like being in space. The idea caught Dean's imagination and wanted to portray such a concept into one of his designs. He added: "I started with a horizon low down with a lot of sky but then I realised, no, I'll show with ocean in the main area with a sky just a sliver, enough to show it is mirrored. Then I decided to put in a rock formation–a viewing point for the sky." An early design of the band's logo for the cover featured a colour scheme and texture based on the Nebra sky disc, an artefact from the Early Bronze Age discovered in Germany in 1999 that Howe had suggested to Dean. It was not used as the colours did not complement the rest of the design.

Songs
"Cut from the Stars" was primarily inspired by Davison's first visit to a dark-sky preserve at Joshua Tree National Park with his brother and father, who encouraged him to appreciate nature. Davison praised Sherwood's instrumental ideas he had for the song, and the "twinkling" sound it portrayed to Davison made him write words relating to the sky. Davison took Sherwood's initial parts and rearranged them using audio editing software to make a new arrangement, after which the band built on it and reproduced their respective parts. Howe took what was the song's bridge and made it an instrumental outro.

Release
An update about the album came in January 2023, when Dean unveiled sketches for the cover of a new Yes album on his Facebook page. A major update arrived in the March 2023 edition of Prog magazine, which featured an interview with Howe who spoke about the album. On 10 March, Yes officially announced Mirror to the Sky on social media and their official website YesWorld, revealing the cover art, release date, and track listing. They announced that the album will be dedicated to White. On the same day, the opening track, "Cut from the Stars", was released as a digital single.

Track listing

Personnel
Yes
Steve Howe – guitars, backing vocals
Geoff Downes – keyboards
Billy Sherwood – bass guitar, backing vocals
Jon Davison – lead vocals
Jay Schellen – drums, percussion

Additional musicians
FAMES Studio Orchestra
Oleg Kondratenko – conductor
Paul K. Joyce – orchestral arrangements

Production
Steve Howe – producer
Curtis Schwartz – engineering, mixing
Roger Dean – cover art, logo

References

Yes (band) albums
2023 albums
Albums with cover art by Roger Dean (artist)
Inside Out Music albums